NGC 4298 is a flocculent spiral galaxy located about 53 million light-years away in the constellation Coma Berenices. The galaxy was discovered by astronomer William Herschel on April 8, 1784 and is a member of the Virgo Cluster.

NGC 4298 may harbor an intermediate-mass black hole with an estimated mass ranging from 20,000 ( M☉) to 500,000 ( M☉) solar masses.

Interaction with NGC 4302
NGC 4298 appears to form a pair with and appears to interact with NGC 4302. Evidence for an interaction between the two galaxies are that NGC 4298 exhibits a lopsided, asymmetrical distribution of stars, a tidal bridge that connects it to NGC 4302, a prodigious rate of star formation and an HI-tail. However, the tail is also the result of ram pressure.     

The two galaxies are separated from a projected distance of ~.

Ram-pressure stripping
The presence of a truncated gas disc,  an asymmetric 6 cm polarized radio continuum distribution, an HI-tail,  and asymmetries of gas in a similar direction as the ram pressure stripped gas in NGC 4302 suggest that NGC 4298 is under going ram pressure.

See also 
 List of NGC objects (4001–5000)

References

External links 

4298
7412
39950
Coma Berenices
Astronomical objects discovered in 1784
Flocculent spiral galaxies
Virgo Cluster
Interacting galaxies
Discoveries by William Herschel